Kali Banerjee (20 November 1920 – 5 July 1993) was an Indian actor, who worked in the 1950s–1970s in Bengali cinema. He is best known for his work with film directors like  Satyajit Ray in Parash Pathar (1958) and Ritwik Ghatak in Nagarik (1952) and Ajantrik (1958).

Career
Starring in many commercial ventures in the 1960s, his association with the serious film-makers is what has given the actor an imperishable place in the history of Bengali cinema. He starred first in the movie named 'Tatinir Bichar' and 'Barmar Pathe' (On the way to Burma). Further he brought out a convincing portrayal of a young Chinese vendor Lu Wang in the street of Kolkata in time of India's freedom struggle in Mrinal Sen's Neel Akasher Neechey (1959).

He acted in Satyajit Ray's Parash Pathar (1958) and Teen Kanya (1961), but it was his association with Ritwik Ghatak, with whom he worked in Nagarik (1952), Ajantrik (1958) that the cinephiles mostly enjoy and want to commemorate.

He played a Bahurupi in Bari Theke Paliye. Then there was Ajantrik, where he was flawless in the portrayal of an idiosyncratic driver Bimal who is in love with his car. Besides these Arthouse films, he acted with aplomb in the films such as * Kabuliwala (1956), Badsha, Kinu Gowalar Goli, Guru Dakshina  and the Hindi films such as Bawarchi (1972) directed by Hrishikesh Mukherjee.

He acted as the leading character 'Totla Ganesh' (stammering Ganesh) in Satyen Bose's popular hit comedy Barjatri (1951) (English title: The Marriage Procession). The Bengali movie-goer fondly remembers his understated comedy and excellent comic timing in the film. After that he worked in hundreds of Bengali commercial movies. Important side roles played by Banerjee in all those movies made him very popular in Tollywood (Bengali film industry).

Selected filmography

 Tatinir Bichar (1940)
 Burmar Pathey (1947)
 Putul Nacher Itikatha (1949)
 Tathapi (1950)
 Barjatri (1951) - Gansha
 Ratnadip (1951)
 Nagarik (1952) - The Father
 Rani Bhabani (1952)
 Abu Hossain (1952)
 Anibarya (1952)
 Pathik (1953)
 Nabin Jatra (1953)
 Nababidhan (1954)
 Ankush (1954)
 Rickshaw-Wala (1955)
 Sabar Upare (1955) - Inspector Shushil
 Kalindi (1955)
 Debi Malini (1955)
 Raat Bhore (1955)
 Tonsil (1956)
 Aparajito (1956) - Kathak
 Shilpi (1956)
 Sinthir Sindur (1956)
 Khela Bhangar Khela (1957)
 Surer Parashey (1957)
 Kabuliwala (1957)
 Ogo Shunchho (1957)
 Ami Baro Habo (1957)
 Ratri Sheshe (1957)
 Raat Ekta (1957)
 Louhakapat (1958)
 Dakharkra (1958)
 Parash Pathar (1958) - Priyotosh Henry Biswas
 Ajantrik (1958) - Bimal
 Bari Theke Paliye (1958) - Haridas
 Nagini Kanyar Kahini (1958)
 Suryatoran (1958)
 Rajdhani Theke (1958)
 Janmantar (1959)
 Neel Akasher Neechey (1959) - Wang Lu
 Sonar Harin (1959)
 Agnisambhaba (1959)
 Dui Bechara (1960)
 Prabesh Nishedh (1960)
 Natun Fasal (1960)
 Shesh Paryanta (1960)
 Kshudha (1960)
 Teen Kanya (1961) - Phanibhushan Saha (segment "Monihara")
 Pankatilak (1961)
 Punashcha (1961)
 Carey Saheber Munshi (1961)
 Aamar Desh (1962)
 Hansuli Banker Upakatha (1962) - Banwari
 Shubho Drishti (1962)
 Ektukro Agun (1963)
 Akash Pradip (1963)
 Tridhara (1963) - Chhoto-Bapi
 Badshah (1963)
 Saptarshi (1964)
 Kinu Gowalar Gali (1964) - Moni
 Kantatar (1964)
 Dui Parba (1964)
 Subha O Debatar Gras (1964)
 Surer Agun (1965)
 Dinanter Alo (1965)
 Arohi (1964) - Peasant Who Learns to Read
 Joradighir Chowdhury Paribar (1966)
 Seba (1967)
 Hangsa Mithun (1968)
 Raktarekha (1968)
 Boudi (1968)
 Jiban Sangeet (1968)
 Kakhano Megh (1968)
 Pratidan (1969)
 Shasti (1970)
 Aleyar Alo (1970)
 Muktisnan (1970)
 Rupasi (1970) - Ekkari - Thakurda
 Janani (1971)
 Nimantran (1971)
 Atattar Din Pare (1971)
 Maa O Mati (1972)
 Ajker Nayak (1972)
 Bawarchi (1972) - Meeta Sharma
 Andha Atit (1972)
 Bigalita Karuna Janhabi Jamuna (1972) - Dr. Sarkar
 Agnibhramar (1973)
 Aabirey Rangano (1973)
 Prantarekha (1974)
 Sangini (1974)
 Debi Chowdhurani (1974) - Haraballav
 Shanginee (1974)
 Umno O Jhumno (1975)
 Natun Surya (1975)
 Sansar Simante (1975)
 Swayamsiddha (1975)
 Khudha (1975)
 Swikarakti (1976)
 Harmonium (1976) - Harendra Kumar Chatterjee
 Hangsaraj (1976)
 Dampati (1976)
 Yugo Manab Kabir (1976)
 Sandhya Surya (1976)
 Ek Bindu Sukh (1977)
 Ek Je Chhilo Desh (1977)
 Behula Lakhindar (1977)
 Ei Prithibir Panthanibas (1977)
 Pratima (1977)
 Joy Maa Tara (1978) - Nabab
 Tushar Tirtha Amarnath (1978)
 Debdas (1979)
 Ghatkali (1979)
 Sunayani (1979)
 Nouka Dubi (1979)
 Nandan (1979)
 Shesh Bichar (1980)
 Batasi (1980)
 Bichar (1980)
 Dadar Kirti (1980) - Saraswati's father
 Meghmukti (1981)
 Manikchand (1981) - Barda
 Durga Durgatinashini (1982)
 Preyasi (1982)
 Rajbadhu (1982)
 Matir Swarga (1982)
 Agni sambhaba (1959)
 Maa Bhabani Maa Amar (1982)
 Chhoto Maa (1983)
 Nishibhor (1983)
 Jabanbondi (1983)
 Arpita (1983)
 Indira (1983)
 Agamikal (1983)
 Mouchor (1983)
 Dadamoni (1984)
 Simantarag (1984)
 Ahuti (1984)
 Pratigya (1985)
 Sonar Sansar (1985)
 Mutkapran (1986)
 Urbashi (1986)
 Parinati (1986)
 Subho Kamon Aachho? (1986)
 Bouma (1986)
 Prem Bandhan (1986)
 Lalan Fakir (1987)
 Debika (1987)
 Gurudakshina (1987)
 Chhoto Bou (1988)
 Debi Baran (1988)
 Anjali (1988)
 Parashmoni (1988)
 Nayanmoni (1989)
 Mangaldeep (1989)
 Shatarupa (1989)
 Sati (1989)
 Satarupa (1989)
 Mangal Deep (1989)
 Kari Diye Kinlam (1989)
 Jaa Devi Sarva Bhuteshu (1989)
 Byabadhan (1990)
 Debata (1990)
 Mahajan (1990)
 Jibansangee (1990)
 Heerak Jayanti (1990)
 Ahankar (1991)
 Abhagini (1991)
 Sadharan Meye (1991)
 Bidhilipi (1991)
 Nyaychakra (1991)
 Purushottam (1992)
 Ananda (1992)
 Shaitan (1992)
 Shraddhanjali (1993)
 Arjun (1993)
 Phire Paoa (1993)
 Ami O Maa (1994)
 Salma Sundari (1994)
 Mejo Bou (1995)
 Abirbhab (1995)
 Boumoni (1995)
 Patibrata (1995)
 Hingsa (1997)
 Chhoto Saheb (2000)
 Tantrik (2002)

References

External links
 

Indian male film actors
1921 births
1993 deaths
Male actors from Kolkata
Male actors in Bengali cinema
University of Calcutta alumni
20th-century Indian male actors